James Haynes (August 9, 1960 – November 14, 2020) was an American football linebacker who played six seasons with the New Orleans Saints of the National Football League. He first enrolled at Coahoma Community College before transferring to Mississippi Valley State University. He attended Tallulah High School in Tallulah, Louisiana.

References

External links
Just Sports Stats
James Haynes obit

1960 births
2020 deaths
Players of American football from Louisiana
American football linebackers
Mississippi Valley State Delta Devils football players
New Orleans Saints players
People from Tallulah, Louisiana